Livv Headphones is a wireless headphone brand designed specifically for athletes. The company was founded in 2013 by former NFL wide receiver Mark Clayton.

Products 
Livv Headphones is targeted for the active lifestyle demographic. The product is primarily intended for athletes and made with audiophile-quality components. The company goes by the motto “designed for the athlete, made by an athlete.”

References

External links 
 Official site
 ProHeadphones

American companies established in 2010
Headphones manufacturers
Audio equipment manufacturers of the United States